The 2009–10 William & Mary Tribe men's basketball team represented The College of William & Mary during the 2009–10 college basketball season. This was head coach Tony Shaver's seventh season at William & Mary. The Tribe competed in the Colonial Athletic Association and played their home games at Kaplan Arena. They finished the season 22–11, 12–6 in CAA play and lost in the championship game of the 2010 CAA men's basketball tournament to Old Dominion. They were invited to play in the 2010 National Invitation Tournament where they lost in the first round to North Carolina.

Preseason
In the CAA preseason polls, released October 20 in Washington, D.C., William & Mary was predicted to finish tenth in the CAA. Sr. guard David Schneider was selected to the preseason all conference second team.

Roster
Source

Schedule and results
Source
All times are Eastern

|-
!colspan=9| Regular Season

|-
!colspan=10| 2010 CAA men's basketball tournament

|-
!colspan=9| 2010 National Invitation Tournament

References

William and Mary Tribe
William & Mary Tribe men's basketball seasons
William and Mary
William and Mary Tribe
William and Mary Tribe